The History of Michigan Wolverines football in the Oosterbaan years covers the history of the University of Michigan Wolverines football program during the period from the promotion of Bennie Oosterbaan as head coach in 1948 through his firing after the 1958 season.  Michigan was a member of the Big Ten Conference during the Oosterbaan years and played its home games at Michigan Stadium.

During the 11 years in which Oosterbaan served as head football coach, Michigan compiled a record of 63–33–4 .  In Oosterbaan's first year as head coach, the 1948 team compiled a perfect 9–0  and won a national championship. The team won Big Ten Conference championships in each of Oosterbaan's first three years as head coach.  In 1950, Michigan defeated Ohio State 9 to 3 in the legendary Snow Bowl game and went on to defeat California by a 14 to 6 score in the 1951 Rose Bowl.

After compiling a 2–6–1 record (1–5–1 Big Ten) record in 1958, and finishing in eighth place in the Big Ten, Oosterbaan was fired and replaced  by Bump Elliott. Three players from the Oosterbaan years have been inducted into the College Football Hall of Fame.  They are Pete Elliott, Alvin Wistert, and Ron Kramer.

Year-by-year results

1948 national championship

In 1948, under first-year head coach Bennie Oosterbaan, Michigan compiled a 9–0 record, defeated six ranked opponents by a combined score of 122–17, and won both the Big Nine Conference and national football championships. In the final AP Poll, Michigan received 192 first place votes, twice as many as second-place Notre Dame which garnered 97 first place votes.

The 1948 season was Michigan's second straight undefeated, untied season. After Fritz Crisler led the 1947 team to a perfect 10–0 record, the Wolverines entered the 1948 season with a 14-game winning streak dating back to October 1946.  Despite the loss of all four backfield starters from the 1947 team (including Big Nine MVP Bump Elliott and Heisman Trophy runner-up Bob Chappuis), the 1948 team extended the winning streak to 23 games.

On offense, Michigan was led by a new backfield that included All-American quarterback Pete Elliott and halfbacks Chuck Ortmann and Leo Koceski. The team scored 252 points, an average of 28 points per game.  With Ortmann as the principal passer, the Wolverines relied on an air attack, gaining more yards in the air (1,355) than on the ground (1,262).  Dick Rifenburg, the team's leading receiver, was picked as a first-team All-American at the end position.  Team captain Dominic Tomasi was selected as the team's Most Valuable Player.  The 1949 Michiganensian wrote of the 250-pound guard, "Famous for his sharp shattering blocking, Dom tore huge gaps in the opposing lines to pave the way for Michigan's steam roller offense."

On defense, the Wolverines allowed only 44 points, an average of 4.8 points per game.  The defense was led by tackles Alvin Wistert and Al Wahl, center Dan Dworsky, and fullback Dick Kempthorn. The team shut out Oregon despite the passing game of College and Pro Football Hall of Fame quarterback Norm Van Brocklin.  It also held ranked Purdue and Northwestern teams to 36 and 47 rushing yards, respectively.  The defense forced a total of 32 turnovers (including 21 interceptions), an average of three-and-a-half turnovers per game.

Rivalries

Michigan State
During the Oosterbaan years, Michigan compiled a 4-6-1 record in the Michigan – Michigan State football rivalry. Oosterbaan became the first head coach in Michigan history to compile a losing record against the Spartans.

Minnesota
During the Oosterbaan years, Michigan compiled an 8-2-1 record in its annual Little Brown Jug rivalry game with the Minnesota Golden Gophers.

Notre Dame
Michigan and Notre Dame did not play each other during the Oosterbaan years.   After playing against each other in 1942 and 1943, the programs did not meet again until 1978.

Ohio State
During the Oosterbaan years, Michigan compiled a 5-5-1 record in the Michigan–Ohio State football rivalry.  Significant games during the Oosterbaan years include:

1948 – Michigan concluded an undefeated season and secured the national championship with a  13–3 win over Ohio State in Columbus.  The game was played in front of a crowd of 82,754 spectators – the second largest crowd in Ohio Stadium history up to that time.  Although Michigan was favored in the game by 14 points, Ohio State dominated the line of scrimmage in the first half, allowing only three first downs by Michigan, one of which came on a penalty.  Ohio State took a 3–0 lead in the first quarter on a 26-yard field goal by Jim Hague.  The kick followed a fumble recovery by Jack Lininger after an errant lateral by Chuck Ortmann.  Michigan took the lead in the second quarter on a 92-yard drive culminating with a 44-yard touchdown pass from Ortmann to Harry Allis. In the fourth quarter, Michigan drove 62 yards for a second touchdown led by the passing of Wally Teninga and Pete Elliott.  The touchdown was scored by fullback Tom Peterson.  Allis converted the first extra point, but missed on the second.  Ohio State outgained Michigan on the ground 130 yards to 54, but Michigan outgained Ohio State in the air 116 yards to 73.
1949 – The teams came into the game ranked #5 and #7 in the AP Poll and played to a 7–7 at Michigan Stadium.  With the tie, the teams finished as  Big Ten Conference co-champions.
Snow Bowl (1950) – On November 25, 1950, Michigan defeated the Ohio State Buckeyes, 9–3, earning the Big Ten Conference championship and a berth in the 1951 Rose Bowl.  The game was played at Ohio Stadium under severe winter conditions, including snow and wind, that altered the normal playing of the game dramatically. Michigan won the game despite never getting a first down and failing on all nine pass attempts. The teams punted 45 times, sometimes on first down. The strategy was based on the weather in that both teams felt it better to have the ball in the hands of their opponents near the end zone and hope for a fumble of the slippery ball. The game became famous because of the weather and the difficulty of playing football when the players can't see the lines on the field.  The Buckeyes' first and only score was Vic Janowicz kicking a field goal, after Robert Momsen recovered a blocked Wolverine kick. Michigan scored on a blocked kick that rolled out of the end zone for a safety. With 47 seconds remaining in the first half, Tony Momsen of Michigan blocked a Buckeye punt and fell on it in the end zone for a touchdown and the final score of 9–3.
1951 – In the first year of the Woody Hayes era, the Wolverines defeated the Buckeyes 7–0 at Michigan Stadium.
1958 – In the final game of the Oosterbaan years, Ohio State defeated Michigan 20–14 at Ohio Stadium.

Coaching staff and administration

Assistant coaches
Jack Blott – assistant coach, 1924–1933, 1946–1958 (head football coach at Wesleyan, 1934–1940)
George Ceithaml – assistant coach, 1947–1952
Don Dufek, Sr. – player, 1948–1950; assistant coach, 1954–1965
Bump Elliott – assistant coach, 1957–1958 (head coach 1959–1968)
Robert Holloway – assistant coach 1954–1965
Cliff Keen – assistant coach 1926–1930, 1932–1936, 1941, 1946–1958 (also Michigan's wrestling coach, 1925–1970)
Pete Kinyon – assistant coach 1954–1956
Ernie McCoy, 1940–1942, 1945–1951 (also Michigan's head basketball coach, 1948–1952; athletic director at Penn State, 1952–1970)
Bill Orwig  – assistant coach 1948–1953
Matt Patanelli – assistant coach 1953–1958
Don Robinson, 1948–1956
Wally Weber – assistant coach, 1931–1958
J. T. White – assistant coach, 1948–1955

Others
Ralph W. Aigler – chairman of Michigan's Faculty Board in Control of Athletics, 1917–1942, faculty representative to the Big Ten Conference, 1917–1955
Fritz Crisler – athletic director, 1941–1968 
Jim Hunt – trainer, 1947–1967
Marcus Plant – University of Michigan's faculty representative to the National Collegiate Athletic Association and the Big Ten Conference, 1954–1978

Players

References

Michigan Wolverines football in the Oosterbaan years
Michigan Wolverines football